Tan Boon Heong (born 18 September 1987) is a former World No.1 Malaysian professional badminton player in the men's doubles event.

Career

2004-2006 
Tan was previously paired with Hoon Thien How, with whom he won the World Junior Championships in 2004 and a silver medal at the 2006 Asian Badminton Championships.

2006 
Nearing the Doha Asian Games in 2006, Rexy Mainaky (the Malaysian doubles coach) decided to split them up and partner Tan Boon Heong with Koo Kien Keat instead. This move, nevertheless, proved to be spot-on as this pair went on to become the Asian Games champion, winning the gold medal in their maiden outing by defeating the then Chinese world champions, Cai Yun and Fu Haifeng, in the quarterfinals, Indonesia's Markis Kido and Hendra Setiawan in the semifinals, and finally Luluk Hadiyanto and Alvent Yulianto, also from Indonesia, in the finals. They are the youngest men's doubles to win gold medal at Asian Games at the age of 21 and 19 respectively.

2007 
2007 was the best year for Koo and Tan. They became the first qualifiers to win the Superseries at the Malaysian Open. They also became the World No.1 that year. They won their first All England Open after beating Chinese pair, Cai Yun and Fu Haifeng in straight games.

2008 
They competed at the 2008 Olympics, reaching the quarter-finals.

2009 
At the Japan Open, Tan set the world record for badminton smashes at 421 km/h. This was done under lab conditions and recorded by Yonex representatives, and not in an official match. Later, he and Koo Kien Keat won the bronze medal at the 2009 World Championships.

2010 
At the 2010 BWF World Championships, Tan and partner Koo Kien Keat launched themselves into the semifinals after beating Korean rivals Lee Yong-dae and Jung Jae-sung. In the semifinals they defeated China's Guo Zhendong and Xu Chen 21–14, 21–18. Tan Boon Heong and Koo Kien Keat were the first Malaysian pair to enter a World Championships final in 13 years. In the finals, they played China's Cai Yun and Fu Haifeng and lost 21–18, 18–21, 14–21. The year 2010 was the last time Koo and Tan ranked World No. 1.

2011 
At the 2011 All England Open, Tan and Koo defeated 2008 Olympic champions Markis Kido and Hendra Setiawan in the quarterfinals. They then defeated World champions Cai Yun and Fu Haifeng 21–11, 23–21. They lost to Danes and world no.1 Mathias Boe and Carsten Mogensen 21–15, 18–21, 18–21. In doing so, they failed to win their second All England Open title.

2012 
Tan competed at the 2012 Olympics with Koo Kien Keat, reaching the semi-finals, and losing 0–2 in the bronze medal match to the Koreans.

2013 
Tan and Koo suffered a lot of early round exits in 2013 and a three-year major title drought but they managed to remain in the top 5 of the world ranking.

2014 
As of March 2014, following the resignation of his partner, Koo Kien Keat, which was due to their deteriorating performance, Tan was scratch partnered with several men's doubles players including Goh V Shem, Ow Yao Han, Hoon Thien How and Tan Wee Kiong. Following the tournament, Tan has been officially re-partnered with Hoon Thien How. In August that year, Koo returned to play his last tournament with Tan at the 2014 BWF World Championships. Their last match together was in the third round where they lost to a Chinese Taipei pair with a score of 19–21 in the deciding game.

2015 
In early 2015, Tan announced his resignation from the Badminton Association of Malaysia. Koo and Tan announced that they are coming out of retirement and try to qualify for the 2016 Rio Olympics before they call it quits for good. They are currently sponsored by Seri Mutiara Development Sdn Bhd. They have achieved some breakthroughs this year. Winning the Dutch Open and runners-up in the Thailand Open. They have also made it to 2 Superseries quarterfinals in Australia and Korea.

2016 
In 2016, Koo and Tan managed to enter the top 15 of the world rankings. However, due to the new Olympic qualification requirement set by the BWF whereby each country can send two representatives for each event only if they are both in the top 8 of the world rankings in their discipline and if they are not then only the highest ranked representative will contest, Koo and Tan narrowly failed to qualify for the Olympics.

2017 
Tan and Hendra Setiawan debut tournament at the 2017 Syed Modi International, they managed to advance until the quarter-finals. They reached the final round at the Australian Open but were beaten by third seed Takeshi Kamura and Keigo Sonoda from Japan.

2018 
Tan was partner with Yoo Yeon Seong from South Korea. Subsequently, he was partner with Kim Sa Rang and they play together in men's doubles in 18/19 Purple League.

2019 
Tan was also currently training with Goh V Shem, Tan Wee Kiong, Goh Liu Ying and Chan Peng Soon after their resignation from Badminton Association of Malaysia.

Personal life 
Tan Boon Heong is married to beautician Sherlyn Tan Yean Ling since 2016.

Achievements

BWF World Championships 
Men's doubles

Commonwealth Games 
Men's doubles

Asian Games 
Men's doubles

Asian Championships 
Men's doubles

Southeast Asian Games 
Men's doubles

World Junior Championships 
Boys' doubles

BWF Superseries (8 titles, 10 runners-up) 
The BWF Superseries, which was launched on 14 December 2006 and implemented in 2007, was a series of elite badminton tournaments, sanctioned by the Badminton World Federation (BWF). BWF Superseries levels were Superseries and Superseries Premier. A season of Superseries consisted of twelve tournaments around the world that had been introduced since 2011. Successful players were invited to the Superseries Finals, which were held at the end of each year.

Men's doubles

  BWF Superseries Finals tournament
  BWF Superseries Premier tournament
  BWF Superseries tournament

BWF Grand Prix (8 titles, 5 runners-up) 
The BWF Grand Prix had two levels, the Grand Prix and Grand Prix Gold. It was a series of badminton tournaments sanctioned by the Badminton World Federation (BWF) and played between 2007 and 2017. The World Badminton Grand Prix was sanctioned by the International Badminton Federation from 1983 to 2006.

Men's doubles

  BWF Grand Prix Gold tournament
  BWF & IBF Grand Prix tournament

BWF International Challenge/Series (4 titles, 2 runners-up) 
Men's doubles

  BWF International Challenge tournament
  BWF International Series tournament
  BWF Future Series tournament

Record against selected opponents 
Men's doubles results with Koo Kien Keat against Superseries finalists, World Championships semi-finalists, and Olympic quarterfinalists, plus all Olympic opponents.

  Cai Yun & Fu Haifeng 5–11
  Chai Biao & Guo Zhendong 1–0
  Sun Junjie & Xu Chen 0–1
  Cai Yun & Xu Chen 0–1
  Liu Xiaolong & Qiu Zihan 6–1
  Guo Zhendong & Xie Zhongbo 1–0
  Chai Biao & Hong Wei 0–1
  Guo Zhendong & Xu Chen 3–0
  Fang Chieh-min & Lee Sheng-mu 1–1
  Lee Sheng-mu & Tsai Chia-hsin 2–3
  Lars Påske & Jonas Rasmussen 3–2
  Mathias Boe & Carsten Mogensen 10–5
  Jonas Rasmussen & Mads Conrad-Petersen 1–1
  Jens Eriksen & Martin Lundgård Hansen 4–0
 / Anthony Clark & Robert Blair 1–1
  Anthony Clark & Nathan Robertson 2–1
  Muhammad Ahsan & Bona Septano 2–3
  Luluk Hadiyanto & Alvent Yulianto Chandra 1–1
  Markis Kido & Hendra Setiawan 7–4
  Angga Pratama & Ryan Agung Saputra 1–1
  Kevin Sanjaya Sukamuljo & Marcus Fernaldi Gideon 0-3
  Muhammad Ahsan & Hendra Setiawan 2–1
  Markis Kido & Gideon Markus Fernaldi 0–1
  Shuichi Sakamoto & Shintaro Ikeda 3–2
  Naoki Kawamae & Shoji Sato 5–0
  Hirokatsu Hashimoto & Noriyasu Hirata 2–2
  Hiroyuki Endo & Kenichi Hayakawa 3–0
  Cho Gun-woo & Shin Baek-cheol 1–0
  Jung Jae-sung & Lee Yong-dae 3–13
  Ko Sung-hyun & Yoo Yeon-seong 1–6
  Lee Jae-jin & Hwang Ji-man 1–1
  Ko Sung-hyun & Lee Yong-dae 1–2
  Lee Yong-dae & Yoo Yeon-seong 0–1
  Kim Gi-jung & Kim Sa-rang 1–6
  Choong Tan Fook & Lee Wan Wah 3–1
  Mohd Zakry Abdul Latif & Mohd Fairuzizuan Mohd Tazari 6–4
  Goh V Shem & Tan Wee Kiong 0-2
  Bodin Isara & Maneepong Jongjit 2–0
  Howard Bach & Tony Gunawan 3–0
 / Tony Gunawan & Candra Wijaya 2–2

References

External links 

 
 Tan Boon Heong on YouTube

1987 births
Living people
People from Alor Setar
Malaysian people of Hokkien descent
Malaysian people of Chinese descent
Malaysian sportspeople of Chinese descent
Malaysian male badminton players
Badminton players at the 2008 Summer Olympics
Badminton players at the 2012 Summer Olympics
Olympic badminton players of Malaysia
Badminton players at the 2006 Asian Games
Badminton players at the 2010 Asian Games
Badminton players at the 2014 Asian Games
Asian Games gold medalists for Malaysia
Asian Games silver medalists for Malaysia
Asian Games bronze medalists for Malaysia
Asian Games medalists in badminton
Medalists at the 2006 Asian Games
Medalists at the 2010 Asian Games
Medalists at the 2014 Asian Games
Badminton players at the 2010 Commonwealth Games
Commonwealth Games gold medallists for Malaysia
Commonwealth Games medallists in badminton
Competitors at the 2009 Southeast Asian Games
Southeast Asian Games silver medalists for Malaysia
Southeast Asian Games medalists in badminton
World No. 1 badminton players
Medallists at the 2010 Commonwealth Games